Bagno is a frazione of L'Aquila in the Abruzzo region of Italy.

Frazioni of L'Aquila
Former municipalities of the Province of L'Aquila